The Emmental Alps are a mountain range in the western part of the Alps, in Switzerland. They are located north-west of the Brünig Pass, mainly in the cantons of Lucerne, Bern, and Obwalden, with a small portion in the canton of Nidwalden. The highest summit of the range is the Brienzer Rothorn, which is also the highest point in the canton of Lucerne. The range is named after the Emme valley (German: Emmental). In the north-west corner one finds the relatively low, but widespread, and very furrowed  Napf.

The Emmental Alps are separated from the Bernese Alps by the Aare valley to the south and connected to the Uri Alps by the four lakes Lungerersee, Sarnersee, Wichelsee, and Vierwaldstättersee to the east.

Notable peaks 
Brienzer Rothorn (2,350 m)
Tannhorn (2,221 m)
Arnihaaggen (2,207 m)
Höch Gumme (2,205 m)
Hohgant (2,197 m)
Augstmatthorn (2,137 m)
Pilatus (2,128 m)
Schrattenfluh (2,092 m)
Widderfeld (2,076 m)
Burgfeldstand (2,063 m)
Sigriswiler Rothorn (2,051 m)
Fürstein (2,040 m)
Wilerhorn (2,005 m)
Schafmatt (1,979 m)
Niederhorn (1,963 m)
Sieben Hengste (1,955 m)
Haglere (1,949 m)
Mittaggüpfi (1,917 m)
Schimbrig (1,815 m)
Honegg (1,546 m)
Wachthubel (1,415 m)
Napf (1,408 m)

References
Charles Knapp, Maurice Borel, Victor Attinger, Heinrich Brunner, Société neuchâteloise de géographie: Geographisches Lexikon der Schweiz. Volume 1: Aa - Emmengruppe. Gebrüder Attinger, Neuchâtel 1902, pp. 701–704 (Scan of the page)

External links

 
Mountain ranges of the Alps
Mountain ranges of Switzerland
Landforms of the canton of Bern
Landforms of the canton of Lucerne
Landforms of Obwalden
Lucerne–Obwalden border
Lucerne–Nidwalden border
Bern–Lucerne border
Bern–Obwalden border
Nidwalden–Obwalden border
Landforms of Nidwalden